Sergey Yervandovich Kurginyan (born 14 November 1949) is a Russian politician, scientist, and theatre producer. He is the founder and leader of the Russian ultraconservative neo-Soviet movement Essence of Time.

Biography 
He was born in Moscow; his father, Yervand Amayakovich Kurginyan (1914–1996), of Armenian origin, was a professor of modern history and a specialist on the Middle East. His mother, Mariya Sergeyevna Kurginyan (Bekman) (1922–1989), was a senior research fellow at the Gorky Institute of World Literature, an expert on Thomas Mann and the author of several monographs. His maternal grandfather was a White officer who went over to the Red side in the Civil War; he was executed on 2 November 1938.

Kurginyan graduated from the Moscow Institute of Geological Exploration with the specialty of geophysics (1972). He finished at Shchukin's Theatre School (1983), specializing in "directing the drama." He gained his Ph.D. in Mathematical Sciences, Fellow Institute of Oceanology, USSR Academy of Sciences (1974–1980). Up to 1986, he was a senior research fellow at the Laboratory of Applied Cybernetics, Moscow Institute of Geological Exploration.

Soviet period
Kurginyan was a member of the commission on new theatrical forms of the Theatre Union of the RSFSR and the initiator of the socio-economic experiment "Studio Theatre at the collective work contract." In 1967, while a student, Kurginyan created his own Theatre Studio which in 1986, together with the studios of M. Rozovsky, "the South-West", "Man" and others took part in the experiment "Theatre in the collective work contract." According to the results of the experiment Kurginyan's theatre "On the boards" got the status of a state theatre. The theatre of Sergey Kurginyan confesses Philosophy and metaphysical approach to the phenomena of our time.

From the 1980s, Kurginyan in parallel to his theatre activities was engaged in the analysis of the political process. In November 1987, the executive committee of the Moscow City Council by the decision N 2622 created the "Experimental Creative Center" which was based on the theatre-studio "On the boards" and gave him the set of premises on the Vspolny Lane in Moscow. In January 1989, Kurginyan became the boss of the organization of a new type - "Experimental Creative Center", which was established by the Moscow City Authority on the base of his theater. He repeatedly went to the "hot spots" on behalf of the Central Committee (then - leadership of the Supreme Soviet of the RSFSR) for independent examination.

After unsuccessful attempts to offer his services to the Secretary Central Committee Alexander Yakovlev (1987), chairman of the Presidium of the Supreme RSFSR Vitaly Vorotnikov and the chairman of the KGB Victor Cherbrikov (1988) Kurginyan was close to the second (later the first) Secretary of the CPSU MGK  Yuri Prokofiev and was introduced into groups of the Council of Ministers of the USSR and the Central Committee. In September 1990, at the  brainstorm in the Council of Ministers Kurginyan proposed rigid confiscatory measures and mass repressions against "speculators informal economy", calling the remark Deputy Prime Minister Leonid Abalkin "we already went through it in 1937". He supported in this period close contact with the "Union".

In 1990, Kurginyan ran for the deputies of the RSFSR (on Chertanovskaya territorial district N 58, Moscow). The election program of the candidate S. Kurginyan proposed the strategy for national salvation of Russia which was developed to prevent the disintegration of the Russian economy, society and state. In response to the question of where to get the money to implement this program, a candidate's campaign materials stated that Russia annually loses huge sums of money due to unequal distribution between the constituent republics of the USSR, the unfinished objects, the Union's "projects of the century" and so on.

The Russians were offered to follow the example of Japan and "sparingly and prudently" put all the released funds to the program of national salvation of Russia. 
In 1990, Kurginyan created "Experimental Creative Centre" which main task is to unite aesthetics, ethics and epistemology. Since 2004 this community has associated nongovernmental status in the United Nations.

In 1991, Kurginyan refused to become a counselor of Gorbachev because of differences in attitudes towards the withdrawal of the Communist Party and the country out of the impasse. Kurginyan's idea of relying on an intelligent layer (mainly scientific and technical intelligentsia) for guiding the country through the modernization was supported by Yuri Prokofiev, the secretary of the CPSU MGK. A number of houses in the center of Moscow have been granted to S. Kurginyan who united in the Experimental Creative Center a number of organizations and laboratories with the development breakthroughs.

Post-Soviet period
In 1993, Kurginyan became an advisor of Ruslan Khasbulatov. During events of October 1993 he was in the building of the Supreme Council. He was the developer of the script of the behavior of the opposition forces, an alternative to that which was implemented on 3 October ("march to the Ostankino"). According to him, a campaign plan to Ostankino was provocative. Several times he thwarted provocations, organized among the "White House's Citizens" (so-called "Sokolov's rebellion," etc.), strongly objected to the incorporation in "White House's Citizens" the Barkashov's fellows and other provocative elements.

He led political dialogue and the information campaign in favor of the Supreme Council. September 30 the "party" supporters of the march to the Ostankino, existing inside the building, achieved expulsion of S. Kurginyan as a dangerous enemy. The same day, S. Kurginyan addressed to all the supporters of the Supreme Council with a cautionary note of the impending provocation. The warning was passed through the channels that existed at the time: the information system "The Ring". It also appeared on the tapes of official news (full text in "Russia-XXI», № 8, 1993).

In 1996 he invited the representatives of big business (among them Boris Berezovsky, Mikhail Khodorkovsky, Vladimir Gusinsky, Mikhail Fridman and others) to unite and embark on a constructive public attitude. The result was the famous "Letter from thirteen" which led to the creation of the so-called Semibankirschina — a closed group of oligarchs who owned over 50% of all Russian resources, the majority of Russian mass media, and who promoted Boris Yeltsin during the presidential election of 1996. Between 1996 and 2000 they turned into the main power behind Russian politics and economy, unofficially manipulating Yeltsin and his decisions.

In his own words, he participated in the removal of Gen. Alexander Lebed from the post of Secretary Russian Security Council.
 
In 2007, before the presidential election in Russia he said that "the principle of presidential power in Russia is a more fundamental constitutional than the principle, which refers to the two-term presidency," and expressed concern that "if Putin tries to move from the presidency at a millimeter, it will collapse the system."

From July to December 2010 he was a co-host of TV program "The court of time."

In 2011, after the Congress party United Russia, in comments on the nomination of Putin as a candidate for President of Russia, Kurginyan said that "a process that they would like to turn towards a return to radical liberalism, in this side it did not turn". He added that "the de-Stalinization of radical liberalism, the return to the dead mythology and types of social and cultural life, - this all is over in the near future."
Addressing his supporters, Kurginyan also stressed that this did not happen due to "between others thanks to our modest efforts."

He is the author and the host of the "anti show" program "The essence of time", published since February 2, 2011 on the video-hosting service Vimeo, the site of the Experimental Creative Center and the site of the virtual club "The essence of time". 
The program, among other things, says the idea of the messianic role of Russia in the modern world.

Since August 2011 he is co-host (along with Nicholas Svanidze) of the project "The historical process" on TV "Russia."

Kurginyan wrote many political books such as "Field of the response action", "Russian question", "Post-restructing", "Seventh Scenario","Weakness of power", "Swing", "Esau and Jacob", "Theory and practice of political games", "Radical Islam", "Political Tsunami".

In July 2014, during the war in Donbass, Kurginyan accused Igor Girkin (Strelkov) of surrendering Sloviansk and not keeping his oath to die in Sloviansk. Kurginyan believes that surrendering Sloviansk is a war crime, and Strelkov should be responsible for that. Donbass insurgent Pavel Gubarev whacked Kurginyan in the face, and another Donbass insurgent Alexander Borodai promised to shoot Kurginyan to death. According to Aleksandr Dugin, Kurginyan is a traitor and is working for oligarchs, Yukos and Israel.

In the words of journalist Alexander Nevzorov, if we had had Kurginyan and Dugin instead of Putin, "there would have been hell for all of us to pay, they would have unleashed a European and World War without a shadow of a doubt, without considering consequences at all". But "Dugin and Kurginyan do not have the slightest impact on what is going on in the Kremlin and do not even get coaching there".

References

External links 
 
 
 
 Transcripts of the tv-show of "The court of time"

Other
 All interviews of Sergei Kurginyan on the radio «Echo of Moscow»
 All interviews of Sergei Kurginyan on the radio  «Russian News Service»
 Interviews of Sergei Kurginyan on the radio «Finam FM»
 Сергей Черняховский Strategist of the left Search

1949 births
Living people
Writers from Moscow
Neo-Sovietism
Nationalism in the Soviet Union
Russian people of Armenian descent
Russian bloggers
Russian geophysicists
Russian political scientists
Soviet theatre directors
Defenders of the White House (1993)
Pro-Russian people of the 2014 pro-Russian unrest in Ukraine